Tariq bin Omar bin Faraj Omar (born 20 July 1980), known as Tariq Al-Muwallid, is a Saudi Arabian former professional footballer who played as a defender.

Al-Muwallid represented Saudi Arabia internationally at the 2000 AFC Asian Cup.

References

External links
 
 

1980 births
Living people
Sportspeople from Jeddah
Saudi Arabian footballers
Association football defenders
Ittihad FC players
Al-Hazem F.C. players
Al-Watani Club players
Al-Wehda Club (Mecca) players
Khaleej FC players
Saudi Professional League players
Saudi First Division League players
Saudi Arabia international footballers